Reborn in Defiance is the ninth studio album by American band Biohazard. It is the final album to feature founding member and vocalist/bassist Evan Seinfeld, who left the band in June 2011 shortly after the album was recorded, and the first album since 1994's State of the World Address to feature the original recording line-up, after Bobby Hambel's return to the band in 2008.

The album was released worldwide, with the exception of North America, on January 20, 2012, through Nuclear Blast. The band originally planned to offer a digital edition of the album as a free download for American fans on the same date but these plans were canceled at the last moment.

Critical reception
In a review at SputnikMusic, the site wrote: "Following the vein of Means to End, Reborn in Defiance is a heavy, chunky record, but nothing new for Biohazard. A very solid album, with some enjoyable groove orientated riffs, displaying the essence of their music since their early beginnings as one of the progenitors of rap metal, or nu-metal, Reborn in Defiance has some variance, with tracks such as Killing Me standing out with its clean intro. However, there are a lot of very stagnant guitar parts, mainly the choruses, and some of the verses."

Track list

Personnel 
 Evan Seinfeld – bass, lead vocals
 Billy Graziadei – rhythm guitar, co-lead vocals
 Bobby Hambel – lead guitar
 Danny Schuler – drums

Charts

References

External links
 Reborn in Defiance at Nuclear Blast
 
 

Biohazard (band) albums
2012 albums
Nuclear Blast albums